The Argent-Double Aqueduct is one of several aqueducts on the Canal du Midi.  The Argent-Double stream is culverted under the canal at La Redorte.

Gallery

See also
 Locks on the Canal du Midi

References

Aqueducts on Canal du Midi